Douglas John McDonald (born May 11, 1935) is a Canadian rower who competed in the 1956 Summer Olympics.

In 1956 he was a crew member of the Canadian boat which won the silver medal in the eights event.

External links
 profile

1935 births
Living people
Canadian male rowers
Olympic rowers of Canada
Rowers at the 1956 Summer Olympics
Olympic silver medalists for Canada
Olympic medalists in rowing
Medalists at the 1956 Summer Olympics